Percival Austin Bramble (born January 24, 1931) is a politician from Montserrat. He served as the territory's Chief Minister from December 1970 to November 1978. Bramble is the son of W.H. Bramble, the island's first chief minister. While in office, Bramble helped pass laws to spur development on the island of Montserrat. Among his achievements in this area are the North Road connecting the northern end of the island with its eastern side. Also during his term, medication was made free at the point of delivery for all diabetics and hypertensives.

Leadership
His campaign speech was "I shall slander no one, I shall abuse no one; I shall make no enemies."

References

1931 births
Montserrat Labour Party politicians
Members of the Legislative Council of Montserrat
Living people
Chief Ministers of Montserrat
Children of national leaders